This article presents a list of the historical events and publications of Australian literature during 1992.

Events 
 Tim Winton won the Miles Franklin Award for Cloudstreet

Major publications

Novels 
Thea Astley, Vanishing Points
Lily Brett, What God Wants
Brian Castro, After China
Helen Garner, Cosmo Cosmolino
Peter Goldsworthy, Honk If You Are Jesus
Andrew McGahan, Praise
Alex Miller (writer), The Ancestor Game

Children's and young adult fiction 
Pamela Allen, Belinda
Brian Caswell, A Cage of Butterflies
Garry Disher, The Bamboo Flute
Anna Fienberg, Ariel, Zed and the Secret of Life
Joanne Horniman, Sand Monkeys
Victor Kelleher, Del-Del 
Melina Marchetta, Looking for Alibrandi

Poetry 
 Beatriz Copello, Women, Souls And Shadows
 Robert Harris (poet), Jane, Interlinear and Other Poems
 A. D. Hope, Selected Poems
 Jill Jones (poet), The Mask and the Jagged Star
 Les Murray (poet), Translations from the Natural World
 Elizabeth Riddell, Selected Poems

Drama 
 Julia Britton, Miles Franklin
 Louis Nowra
 Così
 Summer of the Aliens

Non-fiction 
 Robert Adamson (poet), Wards of the State
 Stephanie Dowrick, Intimacy and Solitude
 Sara Henderson, From Strength to Strength: An autobiography
 A. D. Hope, Chance Encounters
 Donna Williams, Nobody Nowhere

Awards and honours 
 Thea Astley  for "service to Australian literature"
 Jack Pollard  for "service to sport and sporting history"

Deaths 
A list, ordered by date of death (and, if the date is either unspecified or repeated, ordered alphabetically by surname) of deaths in 1992 of Australian literary figures, authors of written works or literature-related individuals follows, including year of birth.
 28 January — Dora Birtles, novelist, short-story writer, poet and travel writer (born 1903)
 8 February — Roland Robinson, poet, writer and collector of Australian Aboriginal myths (born 1912)
 24 May — Beatrice Davis, Australia's first full-time book editor (born 1909)
 19 June — Jas H. Duke, performance poet (born 1939)
 1 July — Eric Irvin, writer and historian of Australian theatre (born 1908)
6 December – Mary Finnin, artist, art teacher and poet (born 1906)
 21 December — Paul White, missionary, evangelist, radio program host and author of the Jungle Doctor Series (born 1910)

See also 
 1992 in Australia
 1992 in literature
 1992 in poetry
 List of years in literature
 List of years in Australian literature

References 

1992 in Australia
Australian literature by year
20th-century Australian literature
1992 in literature